The Vallée Bras-du-Nord is an outdoor center in nature, located in the territory of the municipality of Saint-Raymond, in the regional county municipality of Portneuf Regional County Municipality, in the administrative region of Capitale-Nationale, in Quebec, Canada.

This park has five reception stations: Shannahan, Perthuis, Mauvais, Cantin and the main reception (Saint-Raymond sector) whose address is at 107 Grande Ligne, Saint-Raymond, QC, G3L 2Y4.

Main activities 
The park also offers canyoning, via ferrata, fat bike and mountain skiing activities. In terms of nautical activities, this center offers 17.5 km of river descent in calm water.

See also

Related Articles 
 Regional Park (Quebec)
 Bras du Nord, a stream

Notes and references 

2002 establishments in Quebec
Portneuf Regional County Municipality